Augustus Thomas Huxford (29 July 1889 – 1961) was an English professional footballer who played as a winger.

References

1889 births
1961 deaths
People from Brixham
English footballers
Association football wingers
Grimsby St John's F.C. players
Grimsby Town F.C. players
Goole Town F.C. players
Castleford Town F.C. players
Charlton's F.C. players
Worksop Town F.C. players
Brigg Town F.C. players
Louth Town F.C. players
English Football League players